Sir John Hall KCB (1795 in Little Beck, Westmorland – 17 January 1866 in Pisa) was a British military surgeon.

Studying at Guy's Hospital and St Thomas's Hospital, he joined the Army Medical Service in June 1815, being posted to Flanders just in time for the final stages of the Waterloo campaign.  He then served in Jamaica (1818-1827 and 1841–44), Ireland (from 1835 to 1836, and in 1844), Spain and Gibraltar (1836–39), South Africa (1847-51, during the Cape frontier wars) and Bombay (1851–54).

He was ordered from Bombay straight to the Crimea for the Crimean War in 1854, with the rank of Inspector-General of Hospitals, to head its main receiving hospital at Scutari during that campaign.  In that role he came into contact and conflict with Florence Nightingale (whom he called in his letters a "petticoat imperieuse"), though he fully welcomed the help offered by Mary Seacole. He considered that Nightingale's authority as "Superintendent of the Female Nursing Establishment in the English General Military Hospitals in Turkey" extended solely to Turkey and not the entire war zone, and he actively conspired with Mother Mary Francis Bridgemanof the Irish Sisters of Mercy to evade Nightingale's authority by transferring her and the nursing nuns under her to the Crimea without consulting Nightingale.

He returned from the Crimea in 1856, and retired a year later. Though his actions in the Crimea led to his being mentioned in dispatches, becoming a KCB and officer of the Légion d'honneur, and receiving the third class of the Turkish order of the Mejidiye, he also faced criticism for them. Nightingale, who acknowledged his efficiency and ability but regarded him as a wily opponent to her nursing experiment, referred to him as "Knight of the Crimean Burying-Grounds."

The ‘Observations on the Report of the Sanitary Commission despatched to the Seat of the War in the East,’ that he published in 1857 brought him into conflict with John Sutherland and Nightingale, since (with one other pamphlet by Hall) they were intended to rebut her criticisms of his organisation of the army hospitals.  Intending to spend his retirement in India writing a medical history of the Crimean campaign, he was left part-paralysed by a stroke and gave up the intended book, touring Europe instead for the remainder of his life.

References

External links
 Papers of Sir John Hall in the Royal Army Medical Corps Muniments, held at the Wellcome Library
 Sir John Hall's letter-book, held at the Wellcome Library
 Digitised copies of some of Sir John Hall's private papers, held at the Army Medical Services Museum

Sir John Hall Image   http://www.historyofsurgery.co.uk/history/html/hhr07.html

1795 births
1866 deaths
British Army personnel of the Crimean War
People from Westmorland
Knights Commander of the Order of the Bath
Officiers of the Légion d'honneur
Recipients of the Order of the Medjidie, 3rd class
Royal Army Medical Corps officers
British Army personnel of the Napoleonic Wars